John "Chow" Hayes is an Australian former professional rugby league footballer who played in the 1960s and 1970s.

Early life
Hayes was born in Marrickville and left school at 14 to pursue a career in panel beating and also as a professional rugby league footballer.  He played his junior rugby league with a number of clubs most notably Granville where he caught the attention of Western Suburbs.

Playing career
Hayes made his first grade debut against Newtown in 1961 at Henson Park which Wests won 25–15.  In the same year, Hayes played in the 1961 grand final defeat against St George.  Hayes was also selected to play for New South Wales in 1961, featuring in two matches.  In the following two years, Western Suburbs played against St George again in the grand final losing on both occasions with Hayes featuring in those matches.  The 1963 grand final is remembered for the wet and muddy conditions the players competed in and for the photograph of Norm Provan and Arthur Summons embracing at full time which later became an enduring image of rugby league.  There were also accusations that the referee had taken a bribe before the match and stood to earn 600 pounds if St George were to win but this allegation was never proven.  Hayes played a further eight seasons and retired at the end of 1970.

Post playing
Hayes coached the Wests reserve grade side in the early 1970s and then coached North Sydney between 1983 and 1984.  Hayes later became a Chief Inspector in the NSW Police Force and was inducted as a life member at Western Suburbs.

References

1939 births
Living people
Australian police officers
Australian rugby league coaches
Australian rugby league players
New South Wales rugby league team players
North Sydney Bears coaches
Rugby league hookers
Rugby league players from Sydney
Rugby league props
Rugby league second-rows
Western Suburbs Magpies players